Morale, Welfare and Recreation, abbreviated MWR, is a network of support and leisure services designed for use by U.S. servicemembers (active, Reserve, and Guard), their families, military retirees, veterans with 100 percent service-connected disability, current and retired DoD civilian employees, and other eligible participants.

Organization 

Each branch of the United States Armed Forces has a branch of MWR. MWR provides free and discounted recreation to military personnel and their families. Although the facilities provided vary from base to base, the types of services, facilities and programs provided can include fitness centers, pools, marinas, bowling centers, golf courses, restaurants, conference centers, catering, programs for single sailors with special events, access to internet, movies and video games. Army MWR also offers accredited family child care and youth and school aged services at many installations.

Army and Air Force

Army 

The United States Army's Family and MWR Programs is a military organization whose primary mission is to provide the United States Army with programs that fulfill and support the Army Family Covenant. The organization strives to provide soldiers and their families with "the same quality of life afforded the society they protect."

Air Force 
The United States Air Force’s Outdoor Rec agency, the Air Force Services Activity.

Marines 
The United States Marines’ MWR program is the Marine Corps Community Services.

Navy 
The United States Navy's MWR program is run by the Navy Installations Command.

Navy MWR is in most areas where there are Navy personnel stationed in the United States, internationally, and in the fleet.  Many of their programs are operated by "non-appropriated funds," or by the proceeds that they earn rather than by tax dollars.

Coast Guard 
United States Coast Guard MWR.

References

United States military support organizations